Daniel Maa Boumsong (born 20 March 1987) is a Cameroonian former footballer who played as a midfielder.

Career

Inter Milan
Born in Ngambe, Maa Boumsong joined Internazionale in 2005, age 18. He arrived Italy for 2004 Torneo di Viareggio and escaped from the squad to seek asylum. Due to FIGC regulation, he could only signed by an Italian club after 1 year legal residence, which he trained with a Novara local teams before joined Inter. Maa Boumsong was included in the first team at the end of 2004–05 season, playing in end-season and pre-season friendlies. He also named in UEFA Champions League 25-men senior squad, as he was not eligible to List B. A regular in the Primavera youth team, Maa Boumsong made his competitive debut on 30 November 2005, winning Parma in 2005–06 Coppa Italia. On week later, he made his Champions League/European debut against Rangers. He only able to make his Serie A debut near the end of the season, which he was the starting midfielder. That season he won Coppa Italia with both first team and the Primavera team. Later, the FIGC also assigned Inter the 2005–06 Serie A title following the 2006 Italian football scandal.

Treviso
At the start of 2006–07 season, Maa Boumsong at first left for Spezia in July, but on 31 August left for Treviso, along with Alex Cordaz (in co-ownership deal).

On 11 January 2007 he returned to Inter, but along with Leonardo Bonucci, was sold to Treviso in co-ownership deal. Half of Maa Boumsong's contract was tagged for €100,000 at that time. Both players would formally become players of Treviso on 1 July 2007. With Inter Primavera team, Maa Boumsong finished as the runner-up of Coppa Italia Primavera but winning Campionato Nazionale Primavera.

However Maa Boumsong was excluded from Treviso's Serie B plan. He left for Pistoiese before returned to Treviso in January 2008.

Despite the co-ownership deal of Maa Boumsong was renewed in June 2008, Maa Boumsong joined Treviso permanently for an additional €250,000 fee on 1 September. Inter signed Yago Del Piero from Treviso on the same day.

Maa Boumsong then left for another Lega Pro clubs Rovigo. He played 16 games in the Lega Pro Seconda Divisione. In July 2009, Treviso bankrupted, he became a free agent.

Serie D teams
Maa Boumsong joined a Serie D team in 2009–10 season. In September 2010 he joined Noto.

Honours
Inter
 Serie A: 2005–06
 Coppa Italia: 2005–06
Inter Primavera
 Coppa Italia Primavera: 2006
 Campionato Nazionale Primavera: 2007

References

External links
 Inter Archive
 Rovigo Profile 
 AIC profile (data by football.it) 

Cameroonian footballers
Serie A players
Inter Milan players
Treviso F.B.C. 1993 players
U.S. Pistoiese 1921 players
Rovigo Calcio players
Association football midfielders
Cameroonian expatriate footballers
Expatriate footballers in Italy
1987 births
Living people